Allensmore is a village in Herefordshire, England. The church is dedicated to Saint Andrew.

History 
The name 'Allensmore' derives from 'Alan's Moor'. It has been suggested that Allensmore is the place referred to as More in the Domesday Book.  Cricketer Charles Littlehales was the parish Vicar from 1930 to at least 1941.

References

External links

Villages in Herefordshire